Ann Barr Snitow (May 9, 1943 – August 10, 2019) was an American feminist activist, writer and teacher. She was a co-founder of the New York Radical Feminists, and the (co-)author and (co-)editor of several books.

Life
Snitow was born in New York City to a Jewish family. Her father Charles Snitow was born in Hell's Kitchen, Manhattan, the son of Russian-Jewish immigrants Aaron Snitow and Mary Sackowitz. Her mother Virginia Snitow was born in Brooklyn to Louis Levitt of Kiev and Tillie (Toba) Rosenberg of Huși, Romania. Virginia served as President of American Jewish Congress' Women's Division and was an activist in the feminist, anti-racist, and anti-war movements. Ann took her doctorate in London and returned to her home city where she was a founding member of the New York Radical Feminists in 1969 with her friend Ellen Willis.

In the 1970s she became known for her talks on the not for profit New York radio show Womankind on WBAI.

She was a serial movement founder. In 1977 she founded CARASA to campaign against sterilisation and for the right to abortion.

Snitow taught English literature at Manhattan's New School for Social Research in Manhattan during the 1980s, where she established gender studies as another course. In 1981 she gathered together people to form No More Nice Girls, a feminist street theatre group whose message was pro abortion and to uncover female sexuality. Three years later she founded the similarly themed "FACT" which tried to reduce the impact of anti-pornography campaigners. Snitow's approach was summarised as "Pro-sex" as she did not want to see more censorship. In 1983 she brought together her thoughts about feminist sexuality, anti-pornography and prostitution in an essay titled "Powers of Desire: The Politics of Sexuality".

In 1998 she turned historian to recall "The Feminist Memoir Project" about her work.

In 2002 she founded the group "Take Back the Future".

In 2015 she published "The Feminism of Uncertainty (2015)" which gathered together her lifetime of essays. Snitow died in 2019.

Snitow's papers are at Eugene Lang College The New School for Liberal Arts where Snitow was a professor of literature and gender studies.

Founding member of...
New York Radical Feminists in 1969
CARASA (Committee for Abortion Rights and Against Sterilization Abuse), 1977
"No More Nice Girls", 1981, a feminist street theater group focused primarily on abortion and sexuality; 
FACT (Feminist Anti-Censorship Taskforce), 1984, opposing the feminist anti-pornography movement
Network of East-West Women, 1991, with Katha Pollitt, among several others, including Ellen Willis
Take Back the Future, 2002

Selected works

Snitow, Ann Barr (2020). Visitors: An American Feminist in East Central Europe. New York: New Village Press. .

References 

1943 births
2019 deaths
American feminist writers
American activists
American people of Romanian-Jewish descent
American people of Russian-Jewish descent
American people of Ukrainian-Jewish descent
Jewish feminists
Schoolteachers from New York (state)
American women educators
20th-century American writers
New York Radical Feminists members
20th-century American women
21st-century American women